The Ajmer Subah was one of the original 12 subahs that comprised the Mughal Empire after the administrative reform by Akbar. Its borders roughly corresponded to modern-day Rajasthan, and the capital was the city of Ajmer. It bordered the subahs of Agra, Delhi, Gujarat, Thatta, Multan, and Malwa.

History
Mughal patronage of the city of Ajmer in the 16th century through the support of local Sufi shrines (such as one dedicated to Moinuddin Chishti) through waqfs, culminating in Akbar's pilgrimage to the city itself in 1562. Jahangir continued the legacy of pilgrimage and imperial patronage. Shah Jahan visited the shrine as well in 1628, 1636, 1643, and 1654. Aurangzeb visited once, prior to his Deccan campaigns.

For a brief period in the 1720, Ajit Singh of Marwar occupied Ajmer and declared independence from Mughal rule until the Barha Sayyids reconquered the province.

In March 1752, the Maratha peshwas demanded the governorship of Ajmer from the Mughals, and Jayappaji Rao Scindia went to war supporting Ram Singh of Marwar when the request was denied, sacking the city of Ajmer.

Government

Subahdars

Administrative divisions
Ajmer was divided into 7 sarkars under Akbar's reign.

References

Mughal subahs
History of Ajmer
History of Rajasthan